Hang Time is an American teen sitcom that aired on NBC from September 9, 1995, to December 16, 2000, as part of the network's Saturday morning program block for teenagers, TNBC. Created by Troy Searer, Robert Tarlow and Mark Fink, the series featured extensive cast changes throughout its six-season run, similar to its TNBC stablemate Saved by the Bell: The New Class. The show's title is taken from a sports term referring to how long a basketball player stays in the air after leaving the ground for a slam dunk. Hang Time won a Prism Award in 1999 for its accurate depictions of drug use in the season four episodes "High Hoops" and "Breaks of the Game".

Synopsis
The series centers on the exploits of the Deering Tornados boys' varsity basketball team of the fictional Deering High School in the fictional Midwestern town of Deering, Indiana. In the pilot episode, Julie Connor (Daniella Deutscher) transfers to Deering High after moving to Indiana from Chicago, Illinois. Although she meets some initial resistance from the male players on the team, Bill Fuller (Reggie Theus), the team's coach and a former player in the NBA, decides to make Julie the team's first female player after she shows off her basketball skills to the other members of the team – including star player Chris Atwater (David Hanson); Danny Mellon (Chad Gabriel), who develops a crush on Julie upon their first meeting; sometimes overconfident Michael Maxwell (Christian Belnavis) and country-bred Earl Hatfield (Robert Michael Ryan). Head cheerleader Mary Beth Pepperton (Megan Parlen) – whose father is a wealthy, self-made businessman – was initially jealous of Julie, particularly where her boyfriend for most of the first season (until the episode "Let's Get Ready to Rumble") Chris was concerned. Samantha Morgan (Hillary Tuck), the Tornados' team manager, became Danny's girlfriend later in the season.

For the second season, Saved by the Bell executive producer Peter Engel was appointed as the series' showrunner, resulting in extensive changes to the show. About half of the main cast (with Deutscher, Parlen, Gabriel and Theus being the lone holdovers) was let go, with new characters being added in their place. Three new players were added: Little League veteran Josh Sanders (Kevin Bell), who had given up competitive sports after being prodded by his baseball coach to bean another player, but whom the Tornados coaxed out of retirement; Vince D'Amata (Michael Sullivan), a Chicago native, who had previously served as an alternate on the team; and Theodore "Teddy" Brodis (Anthony Anderson), Coach Fuller's godson, whose biological father was another professional basketball player. Cindy Amy Wright (Paige Peterson), who went by her middle name because she loathed her real first one, became head cheerleader...replacing Mary Beth, who was promoted to team manager. Mary Beth's new position would lead to several blundering efforts at initiating her responsibilities, which she often attempted to fix. (Ultimately, Mary Beth was demoted to assistant team-manager, a role in which she thrived.) Storylines also began to increasingly incorporate a balance of plotlines focusing on topical issues relevant to teenagers (such as drug use, underage drinking and sexual harassment) and life lessons about teamwork, alongside wackier comedic plots synonymous with other TNBC series.

The remainder of the series' run featured several cast changes, the most notable being the season four addition of former NFL player Dick Butkus as the Tornados' new coach, Mike Katowinski. Although the series ran for six seasons (earlier storyline references implied/inferred that the characters of Mary Beth and Julie were closer to college age), Daniella Deutscher and Megan Parlen were the only two of the show's original cast members that stayed with the show throughout its entire run. Joining the series in season three were: Adam Frost, who played Michael Manning – the Tornadoes' ace-player, and Julie's later on-again/off-again boyfriend; and Amber Barretto, who played Kristy Ford – the team's head cheerleader (following Amy's unexplained departure), who became drawn into Mary Beth's comedic shenanigans later in the series' run. Eventually, Coach Katowinski would appoint Kristy his new team manager, after firing Mary Beth for one slip-up too many. Frost and Berretto were the other performers to join the Hang Time cast in later seasons...besides being the only regulars besides Deutscher and Parlen to remain on the series until its finale, "Graduation On Three". The students featured in the fifth and sixth seasons all graduated and went to different colleges; however, since Eugene's future college was not mentioned, that character was offered a job. Coach Katowinski's future plans were also not mentioned, but he remained in his position as Deering High's boys' basketball coach, which returned to a roster of all boys.

Cast

Episodes

International broadcasts

References

External links
 Official Website
 

1995 American television series debuts
2000 American television series endings
1990s American high school television series
2000s American high school television series
1990s American teen sitcoms
2000s American teen sitcoms
1990s American sitcoms
2000s American sitcoms
TNBC
NBC original programming
Basketball television series
English-language television shows
Television series about teenagers
Television shows set in Indiana